St. James A.M.E. Church and variations may refer to:

 St. James A. M. E. Church (Sanford, Florida)
 St. James AME Church (Ashland, Kentucky)
 St. James A. M. E. Church (Danville, Kentucky), listed on the NRHP in Boyle County
 St. James AME Church (New Orleans, Louisiana)
 St. James' A. M. E. Church (Newark, New Jersey)
 St. James AME Zion Church (Ithaca, New York)
St. James A. M. E. Church (Darlington, South Carolina) built by Richard Humbert